Pittoconcha is a genus of air-breathing land snails or semislugs, terrestrial pulmonate gastropod mollusks in the family Helicarionidae.

Species
Species within the genus Pittoconcha include:
 Pittoconcha concinna

References

 Nomenclator Zoologicus info

 
Helicarionidae
Taxonomy articles created by Polbot